Clipsham is a small village in the county of Rutland in the East Midlands of England. It is in the northeast of Rutland, close to the county boundary with Lincolnshire. The population of the civil parish was 120 at the 2001 census increasing to 166 at the 2011 census.

The village's name possibly means 'homestead/village of Cylp' or 'hemmed-in land of Cylp'.

The village is well known for its limestone quarries. Clipsham stone, part of the Upper Lincolnshire Limestone Formation, can be found in many of Britain's most famous buildings including King's College Chapel (Cambridge), the Examination Schools in Oxford, York Minster, and in repairs to the Houses of Parliament. The earliest recorded use of Clipsham stone was for Windsor Castle between 1363 and 1368. The London Stone is made of it, however, and dates back at least to about 1100.

The topiary Yew Tree Avenue, once the carriage drive to Clipsham Hall, has been maintained by the Forestry Commission. Many of the trees are over 200 years old and have been trimmed since the late 19th-century into various shapes depicting birds and animals on the tops and designs in relief on the sides. After 2010, Forest Enterprise could not fund the annual trimming and the trees became overgrown and diseased. The Clipsham Yew Tree Avenue Trust, a registered charity, has signed a 20-year agreement with the Forestry Commission to take over the management of the avenue.

St Mary's church is a Grade II* listed building.

The Olive Branch is one of the very few pubs to hold a Michelin star and in 2008 was chosen as winner of the Michelin Pub of the Year.

See also
Clipsham Old Quarry and Pickworth Great Wood
List of types of limestone

References

External links

Clipsham Yew Tree Avenue Trust
Film of Clipsham Quarry in 1927

Villages in Rutland
Civil parishes in Rutland